Phyllophaga ephilida is a species of scarab beetle in the family Scarabaeidae. It is found in Central America and North America.

Subspecies
These two subspecies belong to the species Phyllophaga ephilida:
 Phyllophaga ephilida ephilida (Say, 1825)
 Phyllophaga ephilida virilis Reinhard, 1939

References

Further reading

 

Melolonthinae
Articles created by Qbugbot
Beetles described in 1825